Blas Galindo Dimas (February 3, 1910 – April 19, 1993) was a Mexican composer.

Biography
Born in San Gabriel, Jalisco, Galindo studied intermittently from 1931 to 1944 at the National Conservatory in Mexico City, studying with Carlos Chávez (composition), Candelario Huizar, José Rolón, and Manuel Rodríguez Vizcarra (piano). In 1934, he formed the Grupo de los cuatro with fellow composers Daniel Ayala, Salvador Contreras, and José Pablo Moncayo, seeking to use indigenous Mexican musical materials in art-music compositions .

In 1941, he was an assistant at the Berkshire Music Festival at Tanglewood, and studied under Aaron Copland at the Berkshire Music Center in 1941 and again in 1942, when his orchestral suite Arroyos was performed there (Stevenson 2001). Returning to Mexico in 1942, he became a professor of composition at the National Conservatory and in 1947 was named Director of the conservatory (a position which he held until 1961) as well as director of the music department of the National Institute of Fine Arts . From 1960 to 1965, he was music director for the Symphony of the Mexican Institute of Social Security .

In 1947, Galindo was named Chief of the Department for the National Institute of Fine Arts.  In September 1947, Chávez named him Director of the National Conservatory of Music, a title he maintained until 1961.  Before this appointment he began as a student at the Conservatory, later becoming a professor of many subjects including "harmony, counterpoint, musical analysis, history of music and composition."  While at the Conservatory, Galindo also conducted the student orchestra, reformed the bylaws and built a new building. In August 1949, he was invited to be an adjudicator at the fourth Chopin piano competition in Warsaw. During this visit to Europe he travelled to seven countries to officially inspect schools of music .

In 1952, he married Ernestina Mendoza Vega.  He became Director of Artistic Activities for the Mexican Social Security Institute (I.M.S.S.) in 1955 and in 1959 I.M.S.S. named him Chief of the Music Section of the Department of Social Services.  In 1960, he began conducting the Social Security Institute's Symphony Orchestra. Galindo was a frequent attendee of music festivals and guest conductor of symphony orchestras. Also, he was a lecturer and editor of magazines, sometimes writing articles concerning music.

In 1960, he was able to focus on composition when he was awarded a "fellowship from the Secretary of Public Education".  Galindo retired in 1965 and dedicated himself to his composition, writing some for pleasure and others for "commission".  To do this, he would frequently "retreat from Mexico City to a house in the country for weeks at a time in order to immerse himself fully."  To celebrate the 25th anniversary of the opening of the new building at the Conservatory, he directed the Conservatory orchestra and chorus in 1974.  In July 1974, Galindo accompanied the President of Mexico with "a number of other intellectuals" to South America.

Galindo "constantly [fought] the problem of trying to have [his works] performed more than just once and the financial problems of having them published".  R.P. Conant wrote of Galindo, "He would, however, like to write an opera or even a cycle of operas dealing with the life of Mexico, the agitated life of Mexico  from the Aztec leader Cuauhtémoc through the leaders of Mexican independence like Morelos, Juárez, Zapata, and Cardenas" .

Awards 
"José Angel Lamas" prize from Secretary of Public Education; honor diploma from the Venezuelan Society of Authors and Composers; gold medal as "the best composer of the year"; diploma from the Municipality of Los Angeles, California; National Arts and Science Award for 1958–1964, presented by the President of the republic of Mexico, Adolfo Lopez Mateos

Works 
Galindo's compositions number over 150, and include works in a variety of styles and ensemble forces.

Orchestral 
 1940: Sones de Mariachi
 1942: Concerto No. 1, for piano and orchestra
 1945: Nocturno, for orchestra
 1951: La Manda, ballet 
 1951: Suite from the ballet La manda
 1952: Scherzo mexicano for string orchestra 
 1956: Sinfonía breve, for strings
 1957: Symphony No. 2
 1960: Concerto, for flute and orchestra 
 1961: Concerto No. 2, for piano and orchestra
 1961: Symphony No. 3
 1962: Concerto, for violin and orchestra
 1973: Concertino. for electric guitar and orchestra
 1984: Concerto, for cello and orchestra
 Homenaje a Cervantes, suite
 Letanía erótica
 Obertura mexicana no. 2, for piano and orchestra
 Poema de Neruda, for string orchestra
 Concerto, for flute and band
 Concerto, for guitar and band

Vocal works 
 1939: Jicarita 
 1939: Mi querer pasaba el río 
 1939: Paloma blanca
 1946: Cantata a la Patria, cantata based on the poem Suave Patria by Ramón López Velarde, for mixed choir and orchestra
 1947: Two Songs, for voice and piano
 1947: Three Songs, for voice and piano
 1948: Me Gusta Cuando Callas, after Pablo Neruda
 1957: Cantata Homenaje a Benito Juárez 
 1965: Letania erótica para la paz, cantata on the poem by G. Álvarez
 1975: Cinco canciones a la madre muerta, for voice and piano 
 Dos Corazones for mixed choir
 Arrullo, for soloist and orchestra
 Canciones de Jalisco
 Madre mía cuando muera, for soprano and orchestra
 Segundo himno de Jalisco

Chamber music 
 1947: Sonata, for clarinet and piano
 1948: Sonata, for cello and piano
 1956: Sonata, for violin and piano
 1961: Piano Quintet
 1961: Suite, for violin and piano
 1972: String Quartet

Solo piano 
 1935: La lagartija
 1936: Suite No. 2
 Impresión
 Caricatura de vals
 Jalisciense
 1937: Sombra, Preludio
 1937: Prelude
 1938: Llano alegre
 1939: Danzarina, waltz
 1941: Fugue in C
 1944: Allegro para una sonata
 1944: Prelude
 1945: Five Preludes
 1945: Y ella estaba triste, Preludio
 1952: Seven Pieces 
 1964-1973: Piezas infantiles
 1976: Sonata
 1987: Preludio No. 6

Cello 
Sonata for unaccompanied cello

Guitar 
 Suplica de Amor

Film scores 
 1955 Raices

References

1910 births
1993 deaths
20th-century classical composers
Mexican male classical composers
Mexican classical composers
National Conservatory of Music of Mexico alumni
Musicians from Jalisco
20th-century male musicians